Motorola Mobility LLC, marketed as Motorola, is an American consumer electronics manufacturer primarily producing smartphones and other mobile devices running Android. It is a subsidiary of the Chinese multinational technology company Lenovo.

Motorola Mobility was formed on January 4, 2011, after a split of Motorola into two separate companies, with Motorola Mobility assuming the company's consumer-oriented product lines (including its mobile phone business, as well as its cable modems and pay television set-top boxes), while Motorola Solutions assumed the company's enterprise-oriented product lines.

In May 2012 Google acquired Motorola Mobility for US$12.5 billion; the main intent of the purchase was to gain Motorola's patent portfolio, in order to protect other Android vendors from litigation. Under Google, Motorola increased its focus on the entry-level smartphone market, and under the Google ATAP division, began development on Project Ara—a platform for modular smartphones with interchangeable components. Shortly after the purchase, Google sold Motorola Mobility's cable modem and set-top box business to Arris Group.

Google's ownership of the company was short lived. In January 2014, Google announced that it would sell Motorola Mobility to Lenovo for $2.91 billion. The sale, which excluded ATAP and all but 2,000 of Motorola's patents, was completed on 30 October 2014. Lenovo disclosed an intent to use Motorola Mobility as a way to expand into the United States smartphone market. In August 2015, Lenovo's existing smartphone division was subsumed by Motorola Mobility.

History 

On January 4, 2011, Motorola Inc. was split into two publicly traded companies; Motorola Solutions took on the company's enterprise-oriented business units, while the remaining consumer division was taken on by Motorola Mobility. Motorola Mobility originally consisted of the mobile devices business, which produced smartphones, mobile accessories including Bluetooth headphones, and the home business, which produced set-top boxes, end-to-end video solutions, cordless phones, and cable modems.  Legally, the split was structured so that Motorola Inc. changed its name to Motorola Solutions and spun off Motorola Mobility as a new publicly traded company.

2012–2014: Under Google ownership 
On August 15, 2011, American technology company Google announced that it would acquire Motorola Mobility for $12.5 billion, pending regulatory approval. Critics viewed Google as being a white knight, since Motorola had recently had a fifth straight quarter of losses. Google planned to operate Motorola as an independent company. In a post on the company's blog, Google CEO and co-founder Larry Page revealed that Google's acquisition of Motorola Mobility was a strategic move to strengthen Google's patent portfolio. At the time, the company had 17,000 patents, with 7,500 patents pending. The expanded portfolio was to defend the viability of its Android operating system, which had been the subject of numerous patent infringement lawsuits between device vendors and other companies such as Apple, Microsoft and Oracle.

On November 17, 2011, Motorola announced that its shareholders voted in favor of the company's acquisition by Google for $12.5 billion. The deal received regulatory approval from the United States Department of Justice and the European Union on February 13, 2012. The deal received subsequent approval from Chinese authorities and was completed on May 22, 2012. Alongside the completion of the acquisition, Motorola Mobility's CEO Sanjay Jha was replaced by Dennis Woodside, a former senior vice president at Google.

On August 13, 2012, Google announced that it would cut 4,000 employees and close one third of the company's locations, mostly outside the US.

On December 19, 2012, it was announced that Arris Group would purchase Motorola Mobility's cable modem and set-top box business for $2.35 billion in a cash-and-stock transaction.

In May 2013, Motorola opened a factory in Fort Worth, Texas, with the intent to assemble customized smartphones in the US. At its peak, the factory employed 3,800 workers. On April 9, 2014, following the departure of Woodside, lead product developer Rick Osterloh was named the new president of Motorola.

Under Google ownership, Motorola's market share would be boosted by a focus on high-quality entry-level smartphones, aimed primarily at emerging markets; in the first quarter of 2014, Motorola sold 6.5 million phones—led by strong sales of its low-end Moto G, especially in markets such as India, and in the United Kingdom—where the company accounted for 6% of smartphone sales sold in the quarter, up from nearly zero. These goals were compounded further by the May 2014 introduction of the Moto E—a low-end device aimed at first-time smartphone owners in emerging markets. In May 2014, Motorola announced that it would close its Fort Worth factory by the end of the year, citing the high costs of domestic manufacturing in combination with the weak sales of the Moto X (which was customized and assembled at the plant) and the company's increased emphasis on low-end devices and emerging markets.

2014–present: Under Lenovo ownership 
On January 29, 2014, Google announced it would, pending regulatory approval, sell Motorola Mobility to the Chinese technology company Lenovo for US$2.91 billion in a cash-and-stock deal, seeing the sale of $750 million in Lenovo shares to Google. Google retained the Advanced Technologies & Projects unit (which was integrated into the main Android team), and all but 2000 of the company's patents. Lenovo had prominently disclosed its intent to enter the U.S. smartphone market, and had previously expressed interest in acquiring BlackBerry, but was reportedly blocked by the Canadian government due to national security concerns. The acquisition was completed on October 30, 2014. The company remained headquartered in Chicago, and continued to use the Motorola brand, while Liu Jun — president of Lenovo's mobile device business, became the company's chairman.

On January 26, 2015, owing to its new ownership, Motorola Mobility re-launched its product line in China with the local release of the second-generation Moto X, and an upcoming release of the Moto G LTE and Moto X Pro (a re-branded Nexus 6) in time for the Chinese New Year.

Lenovo maintained a "hands-off" approach in regards to Motorola's product development. Head designer Jim Wicks explained that "Google had very little influence and Lenovo has been the same." The company continued to engage in practices it adopted under Google, such as the use of nearly "stock" Android, undercutting competitors' pricing while offering superior hardware (as further encouraged by Lenovo), and placing a larger focus on direct-to-consumer selling of unlocked phones in the US market (as opposed to carrier subsidized versions). On July 28, 2015, Motorola unveiled three new devices, and its first under Lenovo ownership—the third-generation Moto G, Moto X Play, and Moto X Style—in three separate events.

Integration with Lenovo 
In August 2015, Lenovo announced that it would merge its existing smartphone division, including design, development, and manufacturing, into the Motorola Mobility unit. The announcement came in addition to a cut of 3,200 jobs across the entire company. As a result of the change, Motorola Mobility will be responsible for the development and production of its own "Moto" product line, as well as Lenovo's own "Vibe" range.

In January 2016, Lenovo announced that the "Motorola" name would be further downplayed in public usage in favor of the "Moto" brand. Motorola Mobility later clarified that the "Motorola" brand will continue to be used in product packaging and through its brand licensees. The company said that "the Motorola legacy is near and dear to us as product designers, engineers and Motorola employees, and clearly it's important to many of you who have had long relationships with us. We plan to continue it under our parent company, Lenovo."

In response to claims by a Lenovo executive that only high-end devices would be produced under the "Moto" name, with low-end devices being amalgamated into Lenovo's existing "Vibe" brand, Motorola Mobility clarified its plans and explained that it would continue to release low-end products under the Moto brand, including the popular Moto G and Moto E lines. Motorola stated that there would be overlap between the Vibe and Moto lines in some price points and territories, but that both brands would have different "identities" and experiences. Moto devices would be positioned as "innovative" and "trendsetting" products, and Vibe would be a "mass-market challenger brand".

In November 2016, it was reported that Lenovo would be branding all its future smartphones under the brand "Moto by Lenovo". In March 2017, it was reported that Lenovo would continue to use the "Motorola" brand and logo, citing its recognition as a heritage cellphone brand. Furthermore, Motorola president Aymar de Lencquesaing stated that Lenovo planned to phase out its self-branded smartphones in favor of Motorola.

Under Lenovo, Motorola has faced criticism for having an increasingly poor commitment to maintaining Android software updates for its devices, exemplified by negative responses to a 2019 announcement that  Android 9.0 "Pie" updates to the Moto Z2 Force in the United States would only be available to the Verizon Wireless model.

Products

Razr

Motorola Mobility's predecessor Motorola Inc released the Razr V3 in the third quarter of 2004. Because of its striking appearance and thin profile, it was initially marketed as an exclusive fashion phone, but within a year, its price was lowered and it was wildly successful, selling over 50 million units by July 2006. Over the Razr four-year run, Motorola sold more than 130 million units, becoming the bestselling clamshell phone in the world.

Motorola released other phones based on the Razr design as part of the 4LTR line. These include the Pebl U6, Slvr L6, Slvr L7 (more expensive variant of Slvr L6), Razr V3c (CDMA), Razr V3i (with upgraded camera and appearance and iTunes syncing for 100 songs), V3x (supports 3G technology and has a 2-megapixel camera), Razr V3xx (supports 3.5G technology) and Razr maxx V6 (supports 3.5G technology and has a 2-megapixel camera) announced in July 2006.

The Razr series was marketed until July 2007, when the succeeding Motorola Razr2 series was released. Marketed as a more sleek and more stable design of the Razr, the Razr2 included more features, improved telephone audio quality, and a touch-sensitive external screen. The new models were the V8, the V9, and the V9m. However, Razr2 sales were only half of the original in the same period.

Because Motorola relied so long upon the Razr and its derivatives and was slow to develop new products in the growing market for feature-rich touchscreen and 3G phones, the Razr appeal declined while rival offerings like the LG Chocolate, BlackBerry, and iPhone captured, leading Motorola to eventually drop behind Samsung and LG in market share for mobile phones. Motorola's strategy of grabbing market share by selling tens of millions of low-cost Razrs cut into margins and resulted in heavy losses in the cellular division.

Motorola capitalized on the Razr too long and it was also slow adopting 3G. While Nokia managed to retain its lead of the worldwide cellular market, Motorola was surpassed first by Samsung and then LG Electronics. By 2007, without new cellphones that carriers wanted to offer, Motorola sold tens of millions of Razrs and their offshoots by slashing prices, causing margins to collapse in the process. CEO of Motorola Ed Zander departed for Dell, while his successor failed to turn around the struggling mobile handset division.

Motorola continued to experience severe problems with its cellphone/handset division in the latter-2000s, recording a record $1.2 billion loss in Q4 2007. Its global competitiveness continued to decline: from 18.4% market share in 2007, to 9.7% by 2008. By 2010 Motorola's global market share had dropped to seventh place, leading to speculation of bankruptcy of the company. While Motorola's other businesses were thriving, the poor results from the Mobile Devices Unit as well as the 2008 financial crisis delayed the company plans to spinoff the mobile division.

Early Android smartphones

Droid 
In 2008, Sanjay Jha took over as co-chief executive officer of Motorola's mobile device division; under Jha's control, significant changes were made to Motorola's mobile phone business, including most prominently, a shift to the recently introduced Android operating system as its sole smartphone platform, replacing both Symbian and Windows Mobile. In August 2009, Motorola introduced the Cliq, its first Android device, for T-Mobile USA. The device also featured a user interface known as Motoblur, which aimed to aggregate information from various sources, such as e-mail and social networking services, into a consistent interface.

A month later, Motorola unveiled the Droid, Verizon Wireless's first Android phone, which was released on November 8, 2009. Backed with a marketing campaign by Verizon, which promoted the device as a direct competitor to the iPhone with the slogan "iDon't," "Droid Does," the Droid was a significant success for Motorola and Verizon. Flurry estimated that at least 250,000 Droid smartphones had been sold in its first week of availability. PC World considered the sales figures to be an indicator of mainstream growth for the Android platform as a whole. The Droid was also named "Gadget of the Year" for 2009 by Time. Other Droid-branded devices would be released by Verizon, although not all of them were manufactured by Motorola.

In 2010, Motorola released the Droid X along with other devices such as the Charm, Flipout, and i1. In July 2010, Motorola reported that it had sold 2.7 million smartphones during the second quarter of 2010, an increase of 400,000 units over the first quarter. Jha stated that the company was in "a strong position to continue improving our share in the rapidly growing smartphone market and improve our operating performance." In its third quarter earnings report, Jha reaffirmed that the Droid X was selling "extremely well."

Atrix 4G, Droid Bionic, XOOM, and Droid RAZR 
On January 5, 2011, Motorola Mobility announced that the Atrix 4G and the Droid Bionic were headed to AT&T and Verizon, respectively, with expected release dates in Q1 of 2011. The Atrix was released on February 22 as the world's first phone with both a Dual-Core Processor and 1 GB of RAM. The phone also had optional peripherals such as a Multimedia Dock and a Laptop Dock which launched a Webtop UI. On February 24, two days after the release of Atrix, the company released Motorola Xoom, the world's first Android 3.0 tablet, and followed it up shortly afterwards with an update to make it the world's first Android 3.1 tablet.

In the fourth quarter of 2011, Motorola unveiled the Droid RAZR, the world's thinnest 4G LTE smartphone at that time at just 7.1 mm. The Droid Razr featured Kevlar backing, the same used in bulletproof vests, and a Gorilla Glass faceplate. The phone was very successful through Verizon Wireless, and many color variants were released. In addition, a Maxx version of the Droid RAZR with an extended battery was released at CES 2012. The Droid RAZR MAXX won CTIA's "Best Smartphone" award. The company also announced new products by late 2011 and early 2012 such as the Xoom 2 tablets, the motoACTV fitness watch with Android, and the Droid 4 with 4G LTE for Verizon Wireless.

Though Jha managed to restore some of the lost luster to Motorola Mobility, it struggled against Samsung and Apple. Even among Android manufacturers, Motorola had dropped behind Samsung, HTC, and LG in market share by the second quarter of 2011. This may have been due to the delay in releasing 4G LTE-capable devices, as well as setting the prices of its new products too high. Jha was replaced by Dennis Woodside as CEO by May 2012, when the Google acquisition was complete.

Motorola released the Droid RAZR HD (and Droid RAZR MAXX HD) as its 2012 flagship devices, featuring improvements over 2011's RAZR. A lower end RAZR M was released, along with an Intel powered RAZR i. Through late 2012 until 2013's third quarter, no further devices were released, except for the lower end RAZR D1 and D3 devices for Latin America.

Google era

Moto X (2013-2015) 

In an August 2013 interview, Motorola Corporate VP of product management Lior Ron explained that the company will focus on the production of fewer products to focus on quality rather than quantity. Ron stated, "Our mandate from Google, from Larry, is really to innovate and take long-term bets. When you have that sort of mentality, it’s about quality and not quantity".

Speaking at the D11 conference in Palos Verdes, California, in May 2013, Motorola CEO Dennis Woodside announced that a new mobile device would be built by his company at a 500,000 square-feet facility near Fort Worth, Texas, formerly used by Nokia. The facility will employ 2,000 people by August 2013 and the new phone, to be named "Moto X", will be available to the public in October 2013. The Moto X featured Google Now software, and an array of sensors and two microprocessors that will mean that users can “interact with [the phone] in very different ways than you can with other devices”. Media reports suggested that the phone will be able to activate functions preemptively based on an "awareness" of what the user is doing at any given moment.

On July 3, 2013, Motorola released a full-page color advertisement in many prominent newspapers across the US. It claimed that Motorola's next flagship phone will be "the first smartphone designed, engineered, and assembled in the United States". On the same day that the advertisement was published, ABC News reported that customers will be able to choose the color of the phone, as well as add custom engravings and wallpaper at the time of purchase.

In early July 2013, the Wall Street Journal reported that Motorola will spend nearly US$500 million on global advertising and marketing for the device. The amount is equivalent to half of Apple's total advertising budget for 2012.

On August 1, 2013, Motorola Mobility unveiled the Moto X smartphone. It was released on August 23, 2013, in the US and Canada.

On September 5, 2014, Motorola Mobility released the Moto X (2nd generation) smartphone. This continued the trend of the company letting consumers customize their devices through their Moto Maker website, and added new customization options like additional real wood choices and new leather options. The device also got many increases in specs. With a new 5.2 inch (13 cm) 1080p super AMOLED pentile display, a faster 2.5 GHz Qualcomm Snapdragon 801 processor, and an improved 13-megapixel rear camera capable of recording 4k resolution video with a dual LED flash. The device also came with new software features along with new infrared proximity sensors.

The Moto X Play and Moto X Style smartphones were announced in July 2015, and were released in September 2015.  Many customers who have ordered customized Moto X Pure Editions via Motorola's website have experienced delays receiving their devices.  These delays have been attributed to issues including manufacturing issues, lack of parts needed to complete assembly of custom phones (black fronts, Verizon SIM cards and 64 GB versions), a possible redesign due to initial phones having a defect that causes one of the front facing speakers to rattle at high volume and multiple day delays clearing US Customs at FedEx's Memphis, TN hub due to issues related to the import paperwork.

The Moto X Force was launched on October 27, 2015. in the US, it was branded as the Droid Turbo 2, and was the flagship Motorola device of the year, offering Snapdragon 810 processor and 3 GB of memory. Like other Moto X devices, it was customizable through Moto Maker. This is the first Motorola smartphone that features Motorola's "ShatterShield" technology, which consists of two touchscreen elements, reinforced by an internal aluminum frame to make it resistant to bending and cracking, although this does not protect against scratches or other superficial screen damage. The top layer of the display is designed to be user-replaceable. The screen and case also have a water repellent nanocoating to protect the device from liquids that could damage internal components. This was also one of the last Motorola phones to be released under Google's ownership.

Droid Mini, Ultra and Maxx 

Droid Mini, Droid Ultra and Droid Maxx were announced in a Verizon press conference on July 23, 2013. These phones share similar design with the predecessing Droid Razr HD lines in different screen and battery sizes, while all featuring the same Motorola X8 Mobile Computing System as the first-generation Moto X, with exclusive features like Motorola Active Notifications and 'OK Google' on device neural-based voice recognition system.

In September 2015, Droid Maxx 2 were launched as Verizon exclusives in the US market, which share the same overall design as the Moto X Style, with Verizon software on board. Unlike its Moto X counterpart, Droid Maxx 2 does not support Moto Maker for further customization. Instead, Moto Shell with 7 different colors was introduced specifically for the device.

Moto G 

On November 13, 2013, Motorola Mobility unveiled the Moto G (1st generation), a relatively low-cost smartphone. The Moto G has been launched in several markets, including the UK, United States, France, Germany, India and parts of Latin America and Asia. The Moto G is available in the United States, unlocked, for a starting price of US$179. The device is geared toward global markets and some US models support 4G LTE. Unlike the Moto X, the Moto G is not manufactured in the United States.

On September 5, 2014, Motorola Mobility released its successor to the 2013 version of the Moto G, called the Moto G (2nd generation). It came with a larger screen, higher resolution camera, along with dual front-facing stereo speakers.

On July 28, 2015, Motorola Mobility released the third generation of the Moto G series, called the Moto G (3rd generation), in a worldwide press conference in New Delhi, India. It retained the same screen as before but upgraded the processor and RAM. Furthermore, it has an IPx7 water-resistance certification and comes into two variants - 1GB RAM / 8GB ROM and 2GB RAM / 16GB ROM. The device also has the latest (at the time) Android Lollipop OS v5.1.1.

In May 2016, Motorola released three fourth generation Moto G smartphones: Moto G⁴, Moto G⁴ Plus, and Moto G⁴ Play.

On February 26, 2017, Motorola Mobility released two fifth generation Moto G smartphones during Mobile World Congress: Moto G5 and Moto G5 Plus.

On August 1, 2017, Motorola added two 'special edition' models to the Moto G lineup, the Moto G5S and Moto G5S Plus.

In May 2018, Motorola released the sixth generation of the Moto G line up in three variants, the G6, G6 Plus and the G6 Play. The G6 and G6 Plus have two rear cameras, capable of taking 4k video (Plus model only), and a larger screen with an aspect ratio of 18:9. The specification ranges from 3/32GB to 6/128GB.

In February 2019, Motorola launched the Moto G7 with 3 extra variants, the Moto G7 Play, Moto G7 Power and the Moto G7 Plus.

Moto E 

The Moto E (1st generation) was announced and launched on May 13, 2014. It was an entry-level device intended to compete against feature phones by providing a durable, low-cost device for first-time smartphone owners or budget-minded consumers, with a particular emphasis on emerging markets. The Moto E shipped with a stock version of Android "4.4 "KitKat"."

The Moto E (2nd generation) was announced and launched on March 10, 2015, in India. Released in the wake of its successful first generation, the second generation of the Moto E series still aims to provide a smooth experience to budget-oriented consumers. It increased the screen size to 4.5" but kept the resolution at 540 x 960px. It came in two versions, a 3G-only one powered by a Snapdragon 200 chipset and a 4G LTE version powered by a Snapdragon 410 chipset. As before, it shipped with a stock version of the latest (at the time) Android 5.0 "Lollipop".

In 2015 Motorola Mobility marketed the 2nd generation Moto E with the promise of continual updates and support, "And while other smartphones in this category don't always support upgrades, we won't forget about you, and we'll make sure your Moto E stays up to date after you buy it." However, 219 days after launch Motorola announced that the device would not receive an upgrade from Lollipop to 6.0 "Marshmallow". It was later announced that the LTE variant of the device would receive an upgrade to Marshmallow in Canada, Europe, Latin America, and Asia (excluding China). China and the US carrier-branded versions of the device remained on Lollipop, with a minor upgrade to version 5.1. However, the 2nd generation Moto E in the USA did continue to receive support via Android Security Patch updates until at least the October 1, 2016 patch for the LTE variant and the November 1, 2016 patch for the non-LTE variant.

Google Nexus 6 / Moto X Pro 

The Nexus 6 was announced October 15, 2014 by Motorola Mobility in partnership with Google. It was the first 6-inch smartphone in the mainstream market, and came with many high-end specs. It was the successor to the Nexus 5, Google's previous flagship phone from their Google Nexus series of devices. Its design was similar to the Moto X (2nd generation) but with a larger display and dual, front-facing speakers rather than the single front-facing speaker on the Moto X. It was the first phone running vanilla Android Lollipop, receiving software updates directly from Google. It was later updated to Android Marshmallow in 2015 and Android Nougat in 2016, though later versions of Android 7.X took some time to arrive, and it never received Android 7.1.2 update, ending its support with Android 7.1.1 in the end of 2017.

On January 26, 2015, Motorola Mobility announced that they would sell the Moto X Pro in China. The Moto X Pro was similar to the Nexus 6 in terms of hardware, but excluded all of Google's services and applications. The phone was released in April 2015 with Android 5.0.2 'Lollipop'. However, it never received any Android version update throughout its lifetime despite the same hardware as the Nexus 6.

Droid Turbo / Moto Maxx / Moto Turbo 

The Droid Turbo (Moto Maxx in South America and Mexico, Moto Turbo in India) features a 3900 mAh battery lasting up to two days. Motorola claims an additional eight hours of use after only fifteen minutes of charging with the included Turbo Charger. The device is finished in ballistic nylon over a Kevlar fiber layer and is protected by a water repellent nano-coating. Droid Turbo uses a quad-core Snapdragon 805 processor clocked at 2.7 GHz, 3 GB RAM, a 21-megapixel camera with 4K video, 5.2-inch screen with resolution of 2560 × 1440 pixels. The Droid Turbo includes 32 or 64 GB of internal storage, while the Moto Maxx is only available in 64 GB.

In late 2015, Droid Turbo 2 was introduced as a Verizon exclusive, which was a rebrand of Moto X Force. It was the first Droid device to offer Moto Mods for extensive customization, and ShatterShield display technologies.

Lenovo era

Moto Z and Moto Mods 

The Moto Z lineup was introduced in June 2016. The smartphone features Motorola's Moto Mods platform, in which the user can magnetically attach accessories or "Mods" to the back of the phone, including a projector, style shells, a Hasselblad-branded camera lens, and a JBL speaker. There were three versions of the original Moto Z. The global flagship model Moto Z, and Moto Z Droid as a Verizon exclusive, were introduced as the thinnest premium smartphone in the world, according to Motorola, and featured a 13-megapixel camera with 4K video, 5.5-inch screen and 4 GB of RAM. and an underclocked Snapdragon 820 chipset at 1.8 GHz, but was able to unlock with root permission granted. Moto Z Play, on the other hand, featured a less powerful processor and a bigger battery. Moto Z Force Droid, only introduced as a Verizon exclusive, featured the Snapdragon 820 chipset with standard frequency, a display with Motorola ShatterShield technology and a 21 megapixel camera. These phones ship with near stock Android 6.0 'Marshmallow' with usual Moto experiences. They were later updated to Android Nougat and Android Oreo in early 2017 and 2018, a substantial delay compared to older Moto X models.

Moto Z2 Play was launched in June 2017 with updated Moto experience, a slightly faster processor than Moto Z Play, and Android Nougat. Moto Z2 Force was launched in July 2017, and was the last Motorola flagship phone with up-to-date processor as for now. It was the first non-Google phone to feature 'A/B partition' and 'seamless update' features of Android Nougat, allowing users to install update in the background and finish with just a restart. It was updated to Android Oreo in the end of 2017, which was fairly speedy compared to other Android OEMs. In China, the phones run ZUI from ZUK, a subsidiary of Lenovo instead of near stock Android, and Moto Z2 Force was rebranded as 'Moto Z 2018'. There were also several Moto Mods released in 2017, including a Motorola TurboPower Moto Mod with fast charging capabilities.

The Moto Z3 lineup was released in August 2018, consisting of Moto Z3 Play with Snapdragon 6-series SoC and Moto Z3 with last generation 8-series SoC, both supporting all Moto Mods introduced. The 5G Moto Mod was introduced alongside the Moto Z3 lineup, and was a Verizon exclusive at launch in early 2019. It enables 5G connectivity for Moto Z2 Force and later Moto Z devices when the mod is attached on the phone. The phones launched with Android Oreo and was later updated to Android Pie with a similar software experience as earlier Moto Z devices.

The Moto Z4 was launched in May 2019 with a 48 megapixel camera sensor and enhanced night sight features, as well as an intergraded fingerprint sensor. It featured a Snapdragon 675 SoC, 4 GB of memory, and launched with Android Pie. Unlike older Moto Z models, this phone was focused on upper mid-range market, and came with a Moto 360 Camera Mod in the box.

Moto M 

The Moto M was introduced in late 2016. It was a mid-range device launched in markets such as mainland China and Hong Kong, Southeast Asia, and South Asia. It featured an octa-core MediaTek processor and 3 or 4 GB of memory depending on storage, and ran near-stock Android. Despite the Moto branding, the bootloader and software update software came from Lenovo directly instead of Motorola, similar to the Moto E3 Power.

Moto C 

The Moto C was announced in 2017 as a low-end device, slotting in below the Moto E as the cheapest in the Moto range. The base model includes a 5-inch display, MediaTek quad-core processor, a 5-megapixel rear-facing camera, and an LED flash for the front-facing camera. It is accompanied by a higher-end model, the Moto C Plus, which features a more powerful processor, larger battery, 8-megapixel camera, and a 720p display.

Moto X4 

The Moto X4 was introduced in August 2017. It featured a 5.2-inch 1080p IPS display compared to Moto X 2014, and 3, 4, or 6 GB of RAM depending on versions. There were three iterations: a retail one from Motorola, an Android One version from Google, and an Amazon Prime edition. Not to be confused with older Moto X models, this phone does not carry on the older Moto X line, and it did not offer some older Moto X exclusive features such as the Moto Maker. The phone came with Android Nougat 7.1.1 and Moto features, with support of 'A/B Partitions' and 'seamless update'. It was updated to Android Oreo and Android Pie in late 2017 and 2018. It was succeeded by the Moto One lineup since 2018.

Motorola One lineup 

In 2018, Motorola launched the Motorola One lineup as upper mid-range replacements for the Moto X4. In August 2018, the first phones in the lineup, the Motorola One and Motorola One Power were launched. Both phones featured dual camera setup, displays with 'notches' for sensors and front facing camera, and they were all in the Android One program by Google, with guaranteed three-year security updates. The phones launched with Android Oreo 8.1, and were later updated to Android Pie and Android 10 at the end of 2018 and 2019.

Motorola One Vision and Motorola One Action were introduced in May and August 2019. These devices all feature Samsung Exynos processors. Moto One Vision featured dual camera setup, with the main shooter being 48 megapixel. It featured a 'hole punch' display for front camera, and 27W TurboPower fast charging. The Motorola One Action featured a triple camera setup with an ultra-wide lens. Both phones were a part of Android One program by Google. They launched with Android Pie, and were updated to Android 10 in early January 2020.

Motorola Razr (2020) 

The Razr is the first foldable smartphone from Motorola, utilizing a similar design as the original Razr. It was introduced in November 2019 and was expected to launch in 2020. It featured mid-range Snapdragon 7-series SoC and Android Pie, with promised updates to Android 10 in 2020.

Motorola Edge & Edge+ 

The Motorola Edge and Motorola Edge+ were introduced in April 2020. The Edge uses the Snapdragon 765G, while the Edge+ uses the Snapdragon 865; both feature Android 10.0, standard 5G and a curved 90 Hz OLED display. The Edge+ is the first Motorola phone to use a 108 megapixel sensor for the main camera with 6K video recording, and marks a return to flagship devices for Motorola.

Smartwatches

Motoactv 

Motoactv is a square smartwatch running Android 2.3 released by Motorola Mobility in 2011. It contained a number of hardware features and software applications tailored to fitness training.

Moto 360 

Moto 360 is a round smartwatch, powered by Google's Android Wear OS, a version of Google's popular Android mobile platform specifically designed for the wearable market. It integrates Google Now and pairs to an Android 4.3 or above smartphone for notifications and control over various features. The second version of this smartwatch was released in 2015.

MINNIDIP x RAZR CH(AIR)
In August 2020, the MINNIDIP x RAZR CH(AIR) was announced by Motorola.

Corporate image

Brand licensing 
The company has licensed its brand through the years to several companies and a variety of home products and mobile phone accessories have been released. Motorola Mobility created a dedicated "Motorola Home" website for these products, which sells corded and cordless phones, cable modems and routers, baby monitors, home monitoring systems and pet safety systems. In 2015, Motorola Mobility sold its brand rights for accessories to Binatone, which already was the official licensee for certain home products. This deal includes brand rights for all mobile and car accessories under the Motorola brand.

In 2016, Zoom Telephonics was granted the worldwide brand rights for home networking products, including cable modems, routers, Wi-Fi range extenders and related networking products.

See also 
 iDEN
 WiDEN
 List of electronics brands
 List of Motorola products
 List of Illinois companies
 Motorola Moto
 Motorola Solutions

References

External links 
 

 
2011 establishments in Illinois
American companies established in 2011
Corporate spin-offs
Manufacturing companies based in Chicago
Electronics companies established in 2011
Electronics companies of the United States
American brands
American subsidiaries of foreign companies
Google acquisitions
Mobile phone manufacturers
Mobile phone companies of the United States
2012 mergers and acquisitions
2014 mergers and acquisitions